Kerzers railway station is a railway station in the municipality of Kerzers, in the Swiss canton of Fribourg. It is located at the junction of the standard gauge Bern–Neuchâtel line of BLS AG and the standard gauge Palézieux–Lyss line of Swiss Federal Railways.

Services 
The following services stop at Kerzers:

 Bern S-Bahn:

References

External links 
 
 

Railway stations in the canton of Fribourg
Swiss Federal Railways stations